Totally Hot is the tenth studio album by British-Australian singer Olivia Newton-John, released on 21 November 1978. Commercially, it became her first top-ten album on the Billboard 200 chart since Have You Never Been Mellow (1975). Dressed on the album cover all in leather, Newton-John's transformation was seen to mirror her character Sandy's transformation in Grease. At the time, Totally Hot was her most successful album, and became her first album to receive a Platinum certification by the Recording Industry Association of America (RIAA).

Background and production
1978 was a big year for Newton-John, when her career soared after she starred in the film adaptation of the Broadway musical Grease in 1978. She was offered the lead role of Sandy after meeting producer Allan Carr at a dinner party at Helen Reddy's home. The movie became the biggest box-office hit of 1978, and the soundtrack album which the former two songs were written and composed by her long-time music producer, John Farrar, specifically for the film, yielded three Top 5 singles for Newton-John, and became one of the best-selling soundtracks of all time.

Newton-John's transformation in Grease from goody-goody "Sandy 1" to spandex-clad "Sandy 2" emboldened Newton-John to do the same with her music career. In November 1978, she released Totally Hot.

Critical reception

The album received favourable reviews from music critics. Joe Viglione from AllMusic gave the album four out of five stars and wrote that the album "is one of the most fun albums from Olivia Newton John". He also said that "[the album] is one of her most satisfying projects" and "one of the more consistently entertaining albums in the collection".

Commercial performance
The album reached No. 30 in the UK (where it was also released as a limited edition picture disc) and it was certified Gold. The album was a top 10 success in Australia, Canada and Japan. The album was re-released in Japan during 2010 featuring two bonus tracks: an extended version of "Totally Hot" and "Love Is Alive" from her 1981 live album, Love Performance.

Although the album de-emphasised Newton-John's country sound, it still reached No. 4 on the Billboard Country Albums chart.

Track listing 
Side one
"Please Don't Keep Me Waiting" (Joe Falsia, Stephen Sinclair) – 5:51
"Dancin' 'Round and 'Round" (Adam Mitchell) – 4:02
"Talk to Me" (Olivia Newton-John) – 3:31
"Deeper Than the Night" (Tom Snow, Johnny Vastano) – 3:39
"Borrowed Time" (Olivia Newton-John) – 3:38

Side two
"A Little More Love" (John Farrar) – 3:29
"Never Enough" (John Farrar, Pat Farrar, Trevor Spencer, Alan Tarney) – 4:13
"Totally Hot" (John Farrar) – 3:14
"Boats Against the Current" (Eric Carmen) – 4:00
"Gimme Some Lovin'" (Spencer Davis, Muff Winwood, Steve Winwood) – 4:15

2010 Japanese SHM-CD bonus tracks
 "Love Is Alive" (Live in Osaka, Japan, December 1976) – 3:04
 "Totally Hot" (extended version) – 5:20

Personnel 
Credits adapted from the album's liner notes.

 Olivia Newton-John – lead and backing vocals
 Jai Winding – pianos (1, 2, 5–10), horn arrangements (8), organ (10)
 Michael Boddicker – synthesizers (1, 2, 7)
 David Foster – pianos (3)
 Tom Snow – pianos (4)
 John Farrar – guitars (1-5, 7–10), backing vocals (4, 8), all album arrangements
 Steve Lukather – guitars (3, 6, 10), guitar synthesizer solo (7) 
 David McDaniels – bass guitar (1, 5)
 David Hungate – bass guitar (2–4, 6–10)
 Mike Botts – drums (1, 2, 5–10)
 Ed Greene – drums (3, 4)
 David Kemper – drums (6, 10)
 Lenny Castro – percussion (3, 6, 8, 10)
 Victor Feldman – percussion (4), vibraphone (4)
 Marty Grebb – alto saxophone (3, 8)
 Jerry Peterson – tenor saxophone (3, 8)
 Chuck Findley – trombone (3, 8)
 Steve Madaio – trumpet (3, 8)
 James Newton Howard – string arrangements (9)
 Sid Sharp – concertmaster (9)

 Sandy Ighner – backing vocals (8)
 Petsye Powell – backing vocals (8, 10)
 Phyllis St. James – backing vocals (8)
 Pattie Brooks – backing vocals (10)
 Carolyn Dennis – backing vocals (10)
 Roy Galloway – backing vocals (10)
 Jim Gilstrap – backing vocals (10)
 Patricia Henderson – backing vocals (10)
 John Lehman – backing vocals (10)
 Zedrich Turnbough – backing vocals (10)

Production
 John Farrar – producer
 David J. Holman – engineer, mixing
 Michael Carnavale – second engineer
 Terry Becker – second engineer
 Betsy Banghart – second engineer
 Bart Johnson – second engineer
 Ron Garrett – second engineer
 George Tutko – second engineer
 Bob Mockler – second engineer
 Allen Zentz – mastering

Studios
 Recorded at Cherokee Studios, Hollywood Sound Recorders and Group IV Recording Studios in Hollywood, California.
 Mixed at Indigo Ranch in Malibu, California.
 Mastered at Allen Zentz Mastering in Hollywood, California.

Design
 Ria Lewerke – art direction, design
 Claude Mougin – photography
 Fleur Thiemeyer – costume design

Business
 MCA Records – record label, US copyright owner (1978)
 EMI Records – record label, UK copyright owner (1978)
 Interfusion Records – record label, Australian copyright owner (1978)

Charts

Weekly charts

Year-end charts

Certifications and sales

References

1978 albums
Olivia Newton-John albums
Albums produced by John Farrar
MCA Records albums